Anbu is a 1953 Indian Tamil-language drama film produced and directed by M. Natesan. The film stars Sivaji Ganesan, T. R. Rajakumari and Padmini. It was released on 24 July 1953.

Plot 
Thangam, a young woman, is married to a much older man, Rajamanickam Mudaliar. He has two children from his first marriage: a daughter Lakshmi, and a son, Selvam. Mudaliar dies when Thangam is pregnant with his child. Selvam falls in love with a rich girl Malathi while Thirumalai, a playboy, tries to separate them. When the widowed Thangam's child is born, Lakshmi spreads rumours that Selvam is the father of the child, and had an incestuous relationship with Thangam. Malathi believes these rumours and begins to torment Thangam. How Thangam surmounts the problems forms the rest of the story.

Cast 

Male cast
 Sivaji Ganesan as Selvam
 T. S. Balaiah as Thirumalai
 D. Duraisami as Rajamanikkam
 K. Thangavelu as Kumar
 Friend K. Ramasami as Bhaskar
Support cast
 Kumari Rajam, Adilakshmi, Rita,Mohana, and Saraswathi.

Female cast
 T. R. Rajakumari as Thangam
 Padmini as Malathi
 Lalitha as Reeta
 M. Rushyendramani as Vijaya
 T. S. Jaya as Balamani
 S. Padma as Lakshmi

Production 
Anbu was produced and directed by M. Natesan under his company Natesh Art Pictures. The story was written by him, and the dialogues by Vindhan. Cinematography was handled by G. Vittal Rao, editing by S. A. Murugesan, and the choreography by P. S. Gopalakrishnan, K. N. Dandayudhapani Pillai and B. Heeralal. Shooting took place at Newtone and Citadel studios.

Soundtrack 
The music was composed by T. R. Pappa. Lyrics by Papanasam Sivan, Kambadasan, Ka. Mu. Sheriff, Suratha, Dandapani and Rajappa.

Release and reception 
Anbu was released on 24 July 1953. Natesh Art Pictures distributed the film themselves in Madras and select regions, while others did so for other regions in Tamil Nadu. Kumudam, a Tamil weekly published the review of this film in a unique way. It was written as such, the characters in the film were telling about their roles. This prompted Natesan to go for a defamation case against the weekly. However, the legal adviser of the weekly settled the matter amicably with Natesan. The film was dubbed into Telugu with the title Apeksha.

References

External links 
 

1950s Tamil-language films
1953 films
Films about widowhood in India
Films scored by T. R. Pappa
Indian drama films
1953 drama films
Indian black-and-white films